The London Chamber Players is a London-based classical music ensemble founded by Bulgarian-born pianist Ivan Yanakov in 2011. The orchestra has performed to critical acclaim in Madrid, Cadogan Hall in London, the Guiting Festival in the Cotswolds, and regularly in London.

References

London orchestras